Beta-defensin 1 is a protein that in humans is encoded by the DEFB1 gene.

Defensins form a family of microbicidal and cytotoxic peptides made by neutrophils. Members of the defensin family are highly similar in protein sequence. This gene encodes defensin, beta 1, an antimicrobial peptide implicated in the resistance of epithelial surfaces to microbial colonization. This gene maps in close proximity to defensin family member defensin, alpha 1, and has been implicated in the pathogenesis of cystic fibrosis.  Single-nucleotide polymorphisms in the DEFB1 gene were associated with plasma kynurenine concentrations in major depressive disorder patients in a genome-wide association study.

References

Further reading 

 
 
 
 
 
 
 
 
 
 
 
 
 
 
 
 
 
 

Defensins